Khlong Yan is a wildlife sanctuary in southern Thailand, located in the west of Surat Thani Province. It is located between the Khao Sok and Kaeng Krung National Park within the hills of the Phuket mountain range.

The wildlife sanctuary is named after the river (Khlong) Yan, a tributary of the Phum Duang River. The valley of the 70km long river marks the center of the wildlife sanctuary. The main attraction within the sanctuary is the Vibhavadi waterfall.

References

Forestry department (Thai only)
Royal Gazette Issue 109, Part 126 (December 30 1992)
ASEAN Center of Biodiversity

Wildlife sanctuaries of Thailand
Tenasserim Hills
Geography of Surat Thani province
Protected areas established in 1992
1992 establishments in Thailand